Squaw Grove Township is one of 19 townships in DeKalb County, Illinois, USA. As of the 2010 census, its population was 2,802 and it contained 1,123 housing units.

Geography

Cities, towns, villages
 Hinckley

Cemeteries
 Greenwood https://www.greenwoodcemeteryhinckleyil.org
 Immanuel Lutheran
 Miller

Airports and landing strips
 Ballek Landing Area
 Hinckley Airport

Demographics

School districts
 Hinckley-Big Rock Community Unit School District 429
 Indian Creek Community Unit District 425
 Sandwich Community Unit School District 430

Political districts
 Illinois's 14th congressional district
 State House District 70
 State Senate District 35

References
 
 United States Census Bureau 2009 TIGER/Line Shapefiles
 United States National Atlas

External links
 City-Data.com
 Illinois State Archives
 Township Officials of Illinois
 DeKalb County Official Site
 Early history of Squaw Grove, Il

Townships in DeKalb County, Illinois
1849 establishments in Illinois
Townships in Illinois